Kamancello is the debut full-length album by Canadian duo Kamancello. Kamancello is composed of cellist Raphael Weinroth-Browne and Kamanche player Shahriyar Jamshidi. The album was released independently on October 13, 2017.

Kamancello is a fully improvised album consisting of 6 tracks that combine features of West Asian and Western Classical music.

Track listing

Personnel
Shahriyar Jamshidi – Kamanche
Raphael Weinroth-Browne – Cello
Leon Taheny – Recording and mixing
Jeff "Fedge" Elliott – Mastering
Raphael Weinroth-Browne - Artwork and photography
Bryan W. Bray – Design and layout

References

2017 debut albums
Kamancello albums